Hyperkinesis may refer to:

Hyperkinesia, abnormally heightened, sometimes uncontrollable muscle movement 
Hyperactivity, abnormally heightened activity
Hyperkinetic disorder, an early childhood-onset disorder characterized by hyperactivity, impulsivity and inattention, similar to attention deficit hyperactivity disorder